Olenecamptus vittaticollis is a species of beetle in the family Cerambycidae. It was described by Heller in 1923, originally as a subspecies of Olenecamptus optatus. It is known from the Philippines. It contains the varietas Olenecamptus vittaticollis var. divisus.

References

Dorcaschematini
Beetles described in 1923